Year 1301 (MCCCI) was a common year starting on Sunday (link will display the full calendar) of the Julian calendar.

Events 
 By place 

 Europe 
 January 14 – With the death of King Andrew III (the Venetian) (probably poisoned), the Árpád Dynasty in Hungary ends. This results in a power struggle between Wenceslaus III of Bohemia, Otto III of Bavaria, and Charles Robert of Naples. Eventually, Wenceslaus is elected and crowned as king of Hungary and Croatia. His rule is only nominal, because a dozen powerful Hungarian nobles hold sway over large territories in the kingdom.
 November 1 – Charles of Valois, son of the late King Philip III (the Bold), is summoned to Italy by Pope Boniface VIII to restore peace between the Guelphs and Ghibellines. He enters Florence, and allows the Black (Neri) Guelphs to return to the city. Charles installs a new government under Cante dei Gabrielli as Chief Magistrate (podestà), leading to the permanent exile of Dante Alighieri, Italian poet and philosopher, from the city.

 England 
 February 7 – The 16-year-old Prince Edward of Caernarfon, son and heir of King Edward I (Longshanks), becomes the first Prince of Wales and is also granted the royal lands in Wales.
 July – First War of Scottish Independence: Edward I (Longshanks) launches his sixth campaign into Scotland. During the campaign, English forces capture Turnberry Castle in Carrick.

 Middle East 
 Spring – Sultan Osman I (or Othman) calls for a military campaign to strike deep into Byzantine Bithynia. During the campaign, Ottoman forces capture the towns of İnegöl and Yenişehir. The later town will be transformed into a capital city, as Osman moves his administration and personal household within its walls. By the end of the year, Ottoman forces begin blockading the major Byzantine city of Nicaea.

 Asia 
 March 2 – Emperor Go-Fushimi abdicates the throne after a 2½-year reign. He is succeeded by his 15-year-old cousin, Go-Nijō, as the 94th emperor of Japan (until 1308).
 July 10 – Indian forces under Sultan Alauddin Khalji capture Ranthambore Fortress. During the siege, General Nusrat Khan Jalesari is hit and killed by a manjaniq stone.

 By topic 

 Religion 
 December – Boniface VIII issues papal bulls accusing King Philip IV (the Fair) of misgovernment.

Births 
 February 6 – Henry Percy, English nobleman, governor and knight (d. 1352)
 June 19 – Morikuni, Japanese prince, shogun and puppet ruler (d. 1333)
 July 23 – Otto I (the Merry), Austrian nobleman and co-ruler (d. 1339)
 August 5 – Edmund of Woodstock, English nobleman and prince (d. 1330)
 September 24 – Ralph de Stafford, English nobleman and knight (d. 1372)
 October 4 – Thomas de Monthermer, English nobleman and knight (d. 1340)
 October 7 – Aleksandr Mikhailovich, Russian Grand Prince (d. 1339)
unknown dates 
 Ingeborg of Norway, Norwegian princess and de facto ruler (d. 1361)
 Nitta Yoshisada, Japanese nobleman, general and samurai (d. 1338)
 Ni Zan, Chinese nobleman, painter, musician and tea master (d. 1374)
 Rudolf II, German nobleman and knight (House of Zähringen) (d. 1352)

Deaths 
 January 14 – Andrew III (the Venetian), king of Hungary (b. 1265)
 February 19 – Pietro Gerra, Italian cleric, archbishop and patriarch
 February 20 – Asukai Gayū, Japanese nobleman and poet (b. 1241)
 March 21 – Guillaume de Champvent, Swiss nobleman and bishop
 May 7 – Hōjō Akitoki, Japanese military leader and poet (b. 1248)
 August 22 – Giacomo Bianconi, Italian priest and scholar (b. 1220)
 September 3 – Alberto I, Italian nobleman and Chief Magistrate
 October 8 – Abu Numayy I, Arabic ruler of the Emirate of Mecca
 November 9 – Bolko I (the Strict), Polish nobleman and co-ruler
 November 19 – Johann III, Polish chaplain, bishop and diplomat
unknown dates
 Blasco I d'Alagona (the Elder), Aragonese nobleman and captain
 False Margaret, Norwegian noblewoman and pretender (b. 1260)

References